Bohemond V of Antioch (1199 − January 17, 1252) was ruler of the Principality of Antioch, a Crusader state, from 1233 to his death. He was simultaneously Count of Tripoli.

Life
Bohemond V was the son of Bohemond IV of Antioch and Plaisance of Gibelet. Like his father before him, Bohemond had a notorious dislike for the Knights Hospitaller and the neighbouring Kingdom of Armenia, preferring an alliance with the Knights Templar. Peace with Armenia was assured only shortly before his death, with the mediation of Louis IX of France.

In 1225, Bohemond was married to Cypriote queen dowager Alice of Champagne. Their childless marriage ended in annulment after July 5, 1227. His second marriage was in 1235 to Lucienne of Segni, a great-niece of Pope Innocent III. He had two children: 
 Plaisance of Antioch, a daughter who became the third wife of King Henry I of Cyprus in 1251
 Bohemond VI of Antioch

Bohemond V died in January 1252.  Since his son and successor was only 15 at the time, he succeeded under the regency of the dowager princess, Lucienne. However, she never left Tripoli, and instead handed over the government of the principality to her Roman relatives.  This made her unpopular, so the young Bohemond VI gained the approval of King Louis IX of France, who was on Crusade at the time, to get permission from Pope Innocent IV to come of age a few months early.

See also
 Opizzo Fieschi, nephew of Innocent IV and Latin Patriarch of Antioch during Bohemond's reign

References

Citations

Bibliography

 

1199 births
1252 deaths
13th-century Princes of Antioch
Bohemond II
House of Poitiers